Lilly Wood and the Prick (also known simply as Lilly Wood and LILLYWOOD) is a French folk pop duo composed of Nili Hadida and Benjamin Cotto. Although the duo is French, Nili was born in Israel. They are best known for their single "Prayer in C", which was remixed and released as a single in 2014 by German DJ and producer Robin Schulz; the song has topped the charts in Austria, Belgium, France, Germany, Israel, Lebanon, Italy, the Netherlands, Spain, Switzerland and the United Kingdom.

Career

2006: Formation
The duo was formed in 2006 when they met in a Parisian café and decided to collaborate on writing songs together.

2008–09: Lilly Who and the What?
After collaborating on a number of songs, in 2008 they made a cover of "L.E.S. Artistes" from Santogold. They also met guitarist Pierre Guimard who heard their songs on Myspace and offered to work with them and opened his studio for production of their work. 2008 saw release of their track on a compilation entitled Folk & Proud followed, in 2009, by the EP of the duo Lilly Who and the What? referring to the stage name of the duo. It was released on Choke Industry independent label founded by Pierre Guimard and by Matthieu Tessier, the duo's manager. After 2009, they signed with another independent label called Cinq7.

2010–13: Invincible Friends and The Fight
Their first studio album Invincible Friends was released on 31 May 2010. On 9 February 2011, they were nominated for "revelation of the public" award for the Victoires de la Musique. On the official ceremony held on 1 March and broadcast on France 2, TV5 Monde and France Inter they won against competition in the same category from Ben l'Oncle Soul, Camélia Jordana, Zaz, Féfé, Guillaume Grand, Florent Marchet and Okou They also engaged on a tour including one at Olympia Paris on 1 June 2011. Their follow up album was The Fight released on 5 November 2012. In 2013, they came to the cinema with a movie called Lilly Wood and The Prick au Trianon directed by Benjamin Lemaire.

2014–2016: "Prayer in C" and Shadows
In June 2014 they released the single for "Prayer in C", a track originally included in their 2010 album, Invincible Friends. German DJ and producer Robin Schulz remixed the song bringing with it success across Europe. The success of the song helped propel the duo into their highest charting solo song in France in 2015 with a song called "I Love You" peaking at number 65. They released their debut album "Shadows" along with two other singles, "Box Of Noise" and a studio session of "Kokomo" in 2016.

2020–present:"Most Anything"

In 2020 they returned with the ballad “Lonely Life” during the COVID-19 pandemic and later announced their new album titled “Most Anything”, an album from which they released the singles “You Want My Money” “A Song” & “In Love For The last time". The album is characterized for being experimental and with new rhythms compared to their previous works.

Time after that they released the Spanish version of "You Want My Money" stylized as (Quieres mi plata).

Members
 Nili Hadida, the band's singer, is an Israeli-French woman born in Tel Aviv, Israel in 1986. She lived in England and California before moving to Paris. She mostly performs French songs, including 1980s and jazzy ballads. She has also performed covers of songs by Elliott Smith and Fiona Apple.
 Benjamin Cotto, guitarist

During live shows, the duo are joined by musicians Pierre Guimard (guitar, bass) and  Mathias Fisch (drums). In September 2010, Clément Fonio joined as bass player. In January 2011, Fonio was replaced by Mathieu Denis (bass, keyboards).

Discography

Albums

Extended plays

Singles

References

External links

Official website

French musical duos
Musical groups established in 2006
Pop-folk music groups
Male–female musical duos